Mary Helen Goldsmith is a plant physiologist known for her work on how hormones impact plant growth. She is a fellow and past president of the American Society of Plant Physiologists.

Education and career 
Goldsmith has a B.A. from Cornell University. She earned her Ph.D. in 1960 from Radcliffe College where she researched the importance of indole acetic acid in the grass, Avena. In 1963 she joined the faculty at Yale University where she worked until her retirement in 2006.

Goldsmith was the director of the Marsh Botanical Garden for sixteen years and included visits to the garden in some of her classes. She also served as the president of the American Society of Plant Physiologists.

Research 
Goldsmith's early work was on impact of oxygen on insects. During her Ph.D., she began to examine the movement of auxins, such as indole acetic acid, into corn. She particularly focused on the polar diffusion of auxins. Her research extends to studies on changes in plant cells during transport of polar chemicals, intracellular measurements of membrane potential, and activation of potassium channels.

Selected publications

Awards and honors 
1986 - Goldsmith received a Guggenheim Fellowship in plant sciences.

 2007 - Goldsmith was named a fellow of the American Society of Plant Biologists.

 Goldsmith has been recognized as a Pioneer Member of the American Society of Plant Biologists.

References 

Cornell University alumni
Radcliffe College alumni
Yale University faculty
Living people
Plant physiologists
Women botanists
Year of birth missing (living people)